George Sidney Ross (June 27, 1892 – April 22, 1935) was a Major League Baseball pitcher. Ross appeared for the New York Giants in one game during the  season, in relief. In that appearance, Ross pitched in 2.1 innings, and gave up two hits, with two strikeouts. He batted and threw left-handed.

Ross was born in San Rafael, California, and died in Amityville, New York.

External links

1892 births
1935 deaths
Major League Baseball pitchers
New York Giants (NL) players
Baseball players from California
Sportspeople from San Rafael, California
Portland Beavers players
People from Amityville, New York